Budy Barcząckie  is a village in the administrative district of Gmina Mińsk Mazowiecki, within Mińsk County, Masovian Voivodeship, in east-central Poland. It is 28 miles (45.7km) to the east of Warsaw.

References

Villages in Mińsk County